Qassab Mahalleh may refer to:
 Qassab Mahalleh, Lahijan
 Qassab Mahalleh, Shaft